This is a list of yacht clubs that have competed for the America's Cup, or in the related Challenger series held since 1970.

See also

List of yacht clubs

References

America's Cup
Yacht clubs that have competed for the America's Cup